Haami 2 is a 2023 Bengali film directed by Nandita Roy and Shiboprosad Mukherjee. The movie is produced by Windows and is distributed regionally by the same. Haami 2 is a fun-filled drama meant for all and sundry. This is a sequel to the blockbuster, Haami (2018), which also addressed the issues of modern-day parenting.

Plot 
The story revolves around a seven to eight-year-old boy, who is a prodigal child; has the ability to perform difficult mathematical problems, the understanding of tough social and economic issues and can pop answers within seconds of asking a question. Hailing from a very middle-class family, boy’s talent becomes a source of income for his parents. The boy’s mother starts taking the child to different TV shows and programmes, despite objections raised by his father, Laltu Mondal. This newly gained fame makes the mother very happy whereas Laltu notices that his son is missing out on a lot of childhood fun that children his age do. This makes him upset. He starts revolting against his wife’s decisions. He faces troubles in making his wife understand his point of view. But he remains adamant to not take his child to any more of those TV shows that promise to explore children’s talents. We often tend to forget what we are doing to a child of that tender age when we force him/her to fulfil our dreams. The climax of the film will show the final leap of the talented boy’s journey. He will go to his last TV appearance on a reality show called Junior Pandit. Will he be able to live up to everyone’s expectations?

Cast 
 Shiboprosad Mukherjee as Laltu Mondal
 Gargee RoyChowdhury as Mitali Mondal
 Ritodeep Sengupta as Bhepu (Sidhartha Mondal)
 Shreyan saha as Chinu (Sugata Mondal)
 Aritrika chowdhury as Ruksana Ali Mirza
 Anjan Dutt as Nitai jetha
 Prosenjit Chatterjee  as Prosenjit Chatterjee
 Kharaj Mukherjee as Prashanta Chakraborty
 Sidhartha Mukherjee as Rukaana's father
 Papri Ghosh as Ruksana's mother
 Haranath Chakraborty as Haranath Chakraborty
 Somak Ghosh as Somak Ghosh
 Monami Ghosh as Monami Ghosh
 Tanusree Chakraborty as Tnusree Chakraborty

Reception 
A critic from The Times of India wrote that "This film however has enough elements to engage almost any age bracket".

References 

 2022 films